William Josiah Crow (January 22, 1902 – October 13, 1974) was a Republican member of the U.S. House of Representatives from Pennsylvania.

William J. Crow was the son of United States Senator William E. Crow. He was born in Uniontown, Pennsylvania. He graduated from the Pennsylvania Military College at Chester, Pennsylvania in 1922 and from Dickinson School of Law in Carlisle, Pennsylvania in 1925. He was a member of the Phi Kappa Psi fraternity.  He was assistant district attorney of Fayette County, Pennsylvania, from 1928 to 1932. He was elected mayor of Uniontown in 1938 and reelected in 1940 for a four-year term and served until called into active service from the Reserves as a Major of Ordnance on June 4, 1941. He served forty-one months overseas in the Pacific theater.

Crow was elected as a Republican to the Eightieth Congress, but was an unsuccessful candidate for reelection in 1948.  He was recalled to active duty with the Ordnance Corps in 1951 and served as chief of legislative coordination branch until 1956. In January 1957, he became a regional administrator for the Securities and Exchange Commission in Washington, D.C.  He moved to Carlisle, Pennsylvania, after retiring in 1964, and served on the Zoning Board and the Parks Commission.

References

The Political Graveyard

1902 births
1974 deaths
20th-century American politicians
United States Army personnel of World War II
People from Uniontown, Pennsylvania
People from Carlisle, Pennsylvania
Mayors of places in Pennsylvania
Military personnel from Pennsylvania
Dickinson School of Law alumni
Widener University alumni
Republican Party members of the United States House of Representatives from Pennsylvania
United States Army officers